Banatska Dubica is a village in Serbia. It is situated in the Sečanj municipality, in the Central Banat District, Vojvodina province. The village has a Serb ethnic majority (85.28%) and its population numbering 428 people (2002 census).

Historical population

1961: 847
1971: 660
1981: 566
1991: 507

See also
List of places in Serbia
List of cities, towns and villages in Vojvodina

References
Slobodan Ćurčić, Broj stanovnika Vojvodine, Novi Sad, 1996.

Populated places in Serbian Banat
Populated places in Central Banat District
Sečanj